Uwe Maerz (born 6 October 1969) is a German lightweight rower. He won a gold medal at the 1996 World Rowing Championships in Motherwell with the lightweight men's eight.

References

1969 births
Living people
German male rowers
World Rowing Championships medalists for Germany